Chiang Wei-kuo (6 October 1916 – 22 September 1997), also known as Wego Chiang, was the adopted son of Republic of China President Chiang Kai-shek, the adoptive brother of President Chiang Ching-kuo, a retired Army general, and an important figure in the Kuomintang. His courtesy names were Jian'gao and Niantang. Chiang served in the Wehrmacht before fighting in the Second Sino-Japanese War and Chinese Civil War.

Early life

As one of two sons of Chiang Kai-shek, Chiang Wei-kuo's name has a particular meaning as intended by his father. Wei literally means "parallel (of latitude)" while kuo means "nation"; in his brother's name, Ching literally means "longitude". The names are inspired by the references in Chinese classics such as the Guoyu, in which "to draw the longitudes and latitudes of the world" is used as a metaphor for a person with great abilities, especially in managing a country.

Born in Tokyo when Chiang Kai-shek and the KMT were exiled to Japan by the Beiyang Government, Chiang Wei-kuo was the biological son of Tai Chi-tao and a Japanese woman, . Chiang Wei-kuo previously discredited any such claims and insisted he was a biological son of Chiang Kai-shek until his later years (1988), when he admitted that he was adopted.

According to reliable rumors, Tai believed knowledge of his Japanese tryst would destroy his marriage and his career, so he entrusted Wei-kuo to Chiang Kai-shek, after  brought the infant to Shanghai. Yao Yecheng, a concubine of Chiang Kai-shek at the time, raised Wei-kuo as his foster mother. The boy called Tai his "Dear Uncle".

Chiang moved to the Chiang ancestral home in Xikou Town of Fenghua in 1920. Wei-kuo later studied physics at Soochow University.

In the Wehrmacht

With his sibling Chiang Ching-kuo being held as a virtual political hostage in the Soviet Union by Joseph Stalin having previously been a student studying in Moscow, Chiang sent Wei-kuo to Nazi Germany for a military education at the Kriegsschule in Munich. Here, he would learn the most up to date German military tactical doctrines, organization, and use of weaponry on the modern battlefield, such as the German-inspired theory of the Maschinengewehr (Medium machine gun, at this time, the MG-34) led squad, and the incorporation of Air and Armored branches into infantry attack. After completing this training, Wei-kuo completed specialized training in Alpine warfare, thus earning him the coveted Gebirgsjäger Edelweiss sleeve insignia. Wei-kuo was promoted to Fahnenjunker, or Officer Candidate, and received a Schützenschnur lanyard.

Wei-kuo commanded a Panzer unit during the 1938 Austrian Anschluss as a Fähnrich, or sergeant officer-candidate, leading a tank into that country; subsequently, he was promoted to Lieutenant of a Panzer unit awaiting to be sent into Poland. Before he was given the mobilization order, he was recalled to China to assist the war effort against the invading Japanese forces.

Service during the Second Sino-Japanese War

Upon being recalled from Germany, Chiang Wei-kuo visited the United States as a distinguished guest of the US Army on behalf of his father and the Kuomintang. While in the United States, he gave lectures detailing on German army organizations and tactics. During the war, Chiang Wei-kuo became acquainted with generals in Northwestern China and organized an armour mechanized battalion to formally take part in the National Revolutionary Army. Chiang Wei-kuo was stationed at a garrison in Xi'an in 1941. In addition, he spent some time in India studying tanks at the U.S. Armored School in 1943. Wei-kuo would become a Major at 28, a Lieutenant Colonel at 29, a Colonel at 32 whilst in charge of a tank battalion, and later in Taiwan, a Major General.

Service during the Chinese Civil War

During the Chinese Civil War, Chiang Wei-kuo employed tactics he had learned whilst studying in the German Wehrmacht. He was in charge of a M4 Sherman tank battalion during the Huaihai Campaign against Mao Zedong's troops, scoring some early victories. While it was not enough to win the campaign, he was able to pull back without significant problems. Like many troops and refugees of the Kuomintang, he retreated from Shanghai to Taiwan and moved his tank regiment to Taiwan, becoming a divisional strength regiment commander of the armoured corps stationed outside of Taipei.

Taiwan 

Chiang Wei-kuo continued to hold senior positions in the Republic of China Armed Forces following the ROC retreat to Taiwan. In 1964, following the Hukou Incident and his subordinate Chao Chih-hwa's attempted coup d'état, Chiang Wei-kuo was in the penalty box and never held any authority in the military.

From 1964 onwards, Chiang Wei-kuo made preparations in establishing a school dedicated to teaching warfare strategy; such a school was established in 1969. In 1975, Chiang Wei-kuo was further promoted to the position of general, and served as president of the Armed Forces University. In 1980, Chiang served as joint logistics commander in chief; then in 1986, he retired from the army and became National Security Council Secretary-General.

After Chiang Ching-kuo's death, Chiang Wei-kuo was a political rival of native Taiwanese Lee Teng-hui, and he strongly opposed Lee's Taiwan localization movement. Chiang ran as vice-president with Taiwan Governor Lin Yang-kang in the 1990 ROC indirect presidential election. Lee ran as the KMT presidential candidate and defeated the Lin-Chiang ticket.

Personal life
In 1944, he married Shih Chin-i, the daughter of Shih Feng-hsiang, a textile tycoon from North West China. Shih died in 1953 during childbirth. Wei-kuo later established the Chingshin Elementary School in Taipei to commemorate his late wife.

In 1957, Chiang remarried, to Ellen Chiu Ru-hsüeh, also known as Chiu Ai-lun, a daughter of Chinese and German parents. Chiu gave birth to Chiang's only son, Chiang Hsiao-kang, in 1962. Chiang Hsiao-kang is the youngest of the Hsiao generation of the Chiang family.

Chiang Wei-kuo was also quite active in civil society, where he was the founder of the Chinese Institute of Strategy and Sino-German Cultural and Economic Association, as well as the Chairman of the Republic of China Football Association. He was the first chairman of Chingshin Primary School and served as the president of the United States Students Association of China.

Chiang was a Freemason, and was the Grand Master of the Grand Lodge of China from 1968 to 1969.

Final years 
In the early 1990s, Chiang Wei-kuo established an unofficial Spirit Relocation Committee (奉安移靈小組) to petition the Communist government to allow his adopted father Chiang Kai-shek and brother Chiang Ching-kuo to be interred in mainland China. His request was largely ignored by both the Nationalist and Communist governments, and he was persuaded to abandon the petition by his father's widow Soong Mei-ling in November 1996.

In 1991, Chiang's housemaid, Li Hung-mei (or ) was found dead in Chiang's estate in the Taipei City. The following police investigation discovered a stockpile of sixty guns on Chiang's estate. Chiang himself admitted the possibility of a link between the guns and his maid's death, which was later ruled a suicide by the police. The incident permanently tarnished Chiang Wei-kuo's name, at a time when the Chiang family was increasingly unpopular on Taiwan and even within the Nationalist Party.

In 1993, Chiang Wei-kuo was employed as a senior advisor to President Lee Teng-hui despite their previous political rivalry.

In 1994, a hospital was supposed to be named after him in Sanchih, Taipei County (now New Taipei City), after an unnamed politician donated to Ruentex Financial Group (潤泰企業集團), whose founder was from Sanchih. Politicians questioned the motivation.

In 1996, the Chiang home on military land was finally demolished by the order of the Taipei municipal government under Chen Shui-bian. The estate had been constructed in 1971. After Chiang moved elsewhere in 1981, he deeded it to his son. The justification was that his son was not in military service and thus was not entitled to live there.

Chiang Wei-kuo died at the age of 80, on 22 September 1997, from kidney failure.  He had been experiencing falling blood pressure complicated by diabetes after a 10-month stay at Taipei Veterans General Hospital, Taipei. He had wished to be buried in Suzhou on the mainland but was instead buried at Wuchih Mountain Military Cemetery.

Political and military career 
His positions in the Republic of China government included:
  Commander of the Army Armored Forces
  Commander-in-Chief of the Combined Services Force
  President of the Army Command and Staff College
  President of the Tri-service University
  Senior advisor of the Office of the President
  Secretary-General of the National Security Council

Full list of military, and civil government positions held:

National Revolutionary Army officer Lieutenant attendant (1936)
German Seventh Army trainee (In November 1936 -1937)
German Army Mountain Division soldiers, 98th Regiment, 2nd Battalion, 5th Company (November 1937 – 1938)
German Army Mountain Division soldiers eighth lieutenant (1938–1939)
NRA First Division Army 3rd Regiment, 2nd Battalion, 5th Company platoon leader (1941)
NRA First Division Army 3rd Regiment, 2nd Battalion, 5th Company Commander (1941)
NRA First Division Army 3rd Regiment, 2nd Battalion deputy battalion commander (1942–1944)
NRA First Division Army 3rd Regiment, 2nd Battalion battalion commander (1944–1945)
Youth Expedition 206 Division, 616 Battalion, 2nd Regiment (1945)
Third Department of the Army armored corps training Director (1945)
Army Corps armored fighting vehicles training, fourth regiment group leader (1945–1946)
Army Corps armored fighting vehicles training, first regiment group leader (1946–1947)
Army Corps armored fighting vehicles training, first regiment commander (1947-?)
Nanjing Private Secondary School in Yining founder (1948)
Armored Force Command Chief of Staff (1948–1949)
Armored Force Command deputy commander (1949 – 1 March 1950)
Armored brigade (1st term) Brigadier (1 March 1950 – 1 June 1953)
Yi Ning, chairman of private secondary school, Taichung City (November 1951 – June 1953)
Jingxin Primary School chairman (1956–1968)
Fifth Department of Defense Director of the Office (1958–unknown)
Armored Force Command (4th term) Commander (1 August 1958 – 1 August 1963)
Department of Defense senior staff
Defense Planning Committee, deputy director of joint operations
Dean of the Army Command and Staff College (1 September 1963 – 1 September 1968)
Sino-German Cultural and Economic Association (1963–1986)
Armed Forces University Vice-Chancellor (1968 – 16 August 1975)
Armed Forces War College University of Institutionalized Persons (1 December 1969)
Armed Forces University, Dean of war (1 December 1969 – 7 April 1980)
Armed Forces University President (16 August 1975 – 7 April 1980)
Central Consultative Committee of the Kuomintang (1976–unknown)
Founder of the Chinese Institute of Strategy (1979)
Taipei Football Association (29 April 1980 – 25 March 1982)
Chief of the General Command of the Joint Duty (7 April 1980 – July 1984)
Meihua Sports Promotion Campaign Committee vice chairman (1980 – 22 September 1997)
Joint Operations Training Officer (1 July 1984 – 18 June 1986)
National Security Council Secretary-General (18 June 1986 – 28 February 1993)
Bureau of the Kuomintang Chairman of the Central Consultative Committee (1988–unknown)
Chairman of the Chinese Institute of Strategy (1990–unknown)
National Unity Committee
Presidential advisor (28 February 1993 – 22 September 1997)
Rotary Club of Taipei

Education history
 Department of Physics, Soochow University
 Tenth Central Military Academy
 Munich Military Academy (1938)
 U.S. Army Air Corps Tactical School (1940)
 U.S. Armored School in India (1943)
 Round Mountain Academy advanced officer corps training (1951),
 U.S. Army Command and Staff College formal training classes (1953)
 School of Social Practice Class III combat training (1955)
 Practical Advanced Military Studies Research Society training classes (1963)

Written works
Grand Strategy Summary 
A Summary of National Strategy 
The strategic value of Taiwan in the world (1977)
The Middle Way and Life  (1979)
Soft military offensive 
The basic principles of the military system (1974)
The Z that creates this age

Gallery

References

Citations

Sources 

 Wang Shichun, (1996). Travelling alone for a thousand mountains: The Life of Chiang Wei-kuo, Tianxia Publishing, Taiwan. 
 Zhou Shao. The trifles of Chiang Wei-kuo's youth, within the volume "Huanghun Xiaopin", Shanghai Guji Publishing House, Shanghai, 1995. 
 Kwan Kwok Huen. Biography of Chiang Wei-kuo. Biography Literature, 78, 4.

External links

See also 
 Sino-German cooperation
 History of the Republic of China
 Military of the Republic of China

Chinese people of Japanese descent
Chiang Kai-shek family
Taiwanese politicians of Japanese descent
Chinese anti-communists
Republic of China Army generals
Taiwanese Freemasons
Senior Advisors to President Lee Teng-hui
Taiwanese people of Japanese descent
1916 births
1997 deaths
Politicians from Tokyo
People of the Chinese Civil War
Military personnel of the Second Sino-Japanese War
Deaths from kidney failure
Deaths from diabetes
Recipients of the Order of Brilliant Star